Taufic Eduardo Guarch Rubio (born 4 October 1991) is a Mexican professional footballer who plays as a forward or winger for Liga Primera club Diriangén FC.

Club career

Estudiantes Tecos

Guarch debuted on the Torneo Apertura 2010, assisted 2 passes for goal in 10 appearances during this tournament. On the Torneo Clausura 2011 he appeared in 7 matches and gave one assist for goal.

Espanyol B

On August 30, 2011, Guarch joined Espanyol B on a season long loan.

International career
Guarch scored his first international goal for Mexico at the 2011 FIFA U-20 World Cup in Colombia on August 1, 2011, against North Korea, in the 54th minute.

During 2014, in awake of Lebanon's elimination in 2014 WC and 2015 Asian Cup qualifying, manager Giuseppe Giannini decided to contact to the Lebanese diaspora players from outside Lebanon. Taufic was captured by Giannini and his performance might have one day he will serve for Lebanese team.

Personal life
Guarch is of Lebanese descent.

Honours
Mexico U20
FIFA U-20 World Cup 3rd Place: 2011
CONCACAF Under-20 Championship: 2011

References

External links
 
 Taufic Guarch, al Espanyol de Barcelona at mediotiempo.com 
  Tienen Estudiantes un Hijo de Dios at tecosuag.blogspot.com 
 
 
 
 

1991 births
Living people
Mexican expatriate footballers
Mexican footballers
Mexico under-20 international footballers
Mexico youth international footballers
Mexican people of Lebanese descent
Mexican people of Cuban descent
Tecos F.C. footballers
RCD Espanyol B footballers
Tigres UANL footballers
C.F. Mérida footballers
Tlaxcala F.C. players
Pioneros de Cancún footballers
Alebrijes de Oaxaca players
Atlante F.C. footballers
Real Estelí F.C. players
Liga MX players
Ascenso MX players
Segunda División B players
Footballers from Guadalajara, Jalisco
Association football forwards
Mexican expatriate sportspeople in Spain
Mexican expatriate sportspeople in Nicaragua
Expatriate footballers in Spain
Expatriate footballers in Nicaragua
Sportspeople of Lebanese descent